Wilfred Burrows (16 February 1902 – July 1985) was an English professional footballer who played as a goalkeeper in the Football League for Tranmere Rovers, Wrexham and York City, in non-League football for Castleford Town, Selby Town, Bangor City, Colwyn Bay United and Shrewsbury Town, and was on the books of Bury without making a league appearance.

References

1902 births
Sportspeople from Castleford
1985 deaths
English footballers
Association football goalkeepers
Castleford Town F.C. players
Selby Town F.C. players
Tranmere Rovers F.C. players
Wrexham A.F.C. players
York City F.C. players
Bangor City F.C. players
Bury F.C. players
Colwyn Bay F.C. players
Shrewsbury Town F.C. players
English Football League players